Kirigome ware is a type of Japanese blue and white pottery originally from Miyazaki, Miyagi Prefecture in the Tōhoku region of northern Japan.

The origins of Kirigome ware are not completely clear, but date back to between 1844 and 1860 in the Edo period.

References

External links 
 
 http://www.pref.miyagi.jp/soshiki/shinsan/11kirigome.html 
 http://www.town.kami.miyagi.jp/index.cfm/11,0,70,169,html

Culture in Miyagi Prefecture
Japanese pottery